Dingle GAA is a Gaelic Athletic Association club in County Kerry, Ireland. They compete in the Kerry Senior Football Championship and wear red and white. CLG Dingle - Daingean Uí Chúis formed in 1967 with the Na Piarsaigh and Sraid Eoin amalgamating.

Achievements
 Kerry Senior Football Championship Winners (6) 1938, 1940, 1941, 1943, 1944, 1948. Runners-Up 1937, 1939, 1947, 2012, 2018.
 Kerry Senior Hurling Championship Runners-Up 1940
 Kerry Club Football Championship Winners (1) 2015
 Kerry County Football League - Division 1 Winners (1) 2021, 2022
 Kerry Intermediate Football Championship Winners (4) 1988, 1989, 1996, 2004  Runners-Up 1998, 2002
 Kerry Junior Football Championship Winners (1) 1971
 Kerry Minor Football Championship Winners (2) 2014, 2015  Runner-Up 1958
 Kerry Under-21 Football Championship Runners-Up 2016, 2018
 Kerry Under-21 Club Championship Winners 2010
 West Kerry Senior Football Championship''' Winners 1981, 1993, 1994, 1995, 1996, 1999, 2003, 2007, 2010, 2012, 2013, 2014 , 2016, 2018, 2019, 2020

Kerry Senior Football Championship
In the 2007 Kerry Senior Football Championship they lost against Dr. Crokes 0-15 v 0-07, went on to play Milltown/Castlemaine with whom they drew 0-14 v 2-08, but won against 1-05 v 1-10 in the replay.
In the second round they drew South Kerry GAA against whom they lost 1-15 v 0-06. 
Dingle have won the Kerry Senior Football Championship 6 times (in 1938, 1940, 1941, 1943, 1944 and 1948).

In 1907 they lost the final against Tralee Mitchels, in 1937 and 1947 against John Mitchels GAA Club.

The 1940 final was won against Kerins O'Rahilly's while the 1941 was won against John Mitchels GAA Club.

Famous players
 Fintan Ashe
 Paddy Bawn Brosnan
 Bill Dillon
 David Geaney
 Michael Geaney
 Paul Geaney
 Seán Geaney
 Tommy Griffin
 Diarmuid Murphy
 Vincent O'Connor
  Daragh Fitzgerald
  Tomás Ó Dubháin

References

External links
Official Dingle GAA Club website
Match report

Gaelic games clubs in County Kerry
Gaelic football clubs in County Kerry
Hurling clubs in County Kerry
Dingle